Insein Road is a major thoroughfare of Yangon, Burma. It connects the centre to the northern part of the city and passes  Insein Township. Many universities are located along this road.

Streets in Yangon